Caroline de Maupeou née Koechlin (1836 – 1915) was a French painter.

She was born in Mulhouse and was trained by Léon Bonnat and Charles Chaplin. She married Count René de Maupeou on 15 February 1855 in Mulhouse. She exhibited her work in Paris at the Salon des Artistes Français from 1878 to 1889. Her painting Girl of Bohemia was included in the 1905 book Women Painters of the World.

References

External links

Caroline de Maupeou on artnet

1836 births
1915 deaths
19th-century French painters
French women painters
19th-century French women artists
20th-century French painters
20th-century French women artists